Rosanna Tomiuk (born October 1, 1984) is a Canadian water polo player from Quebec turned professional coach. She was a member of the Canada women's national water polo team that claimed the silver medal at the 2007 Pan American Games and the 2011 Pan American Games. They also claimed the silver medal at the 2009 World Aquatics Championships in Rome, Italy.

Early life and education 
Tomiuk, who was raised in Montreal, graduated from Loyola Marmount University with a degree in Biology and a minor in Music in 2007.

Career

Early career 
Rosanna began swimming at age 10 with the Beaconsfield Bluefins. At 14, she began playing water polo with the Dollard Water Polo Club. By 15, she was playing with the Quebec Team and at 17 she became a member of the Junior Canadian Women's National Water Polo Team. At 18, she began her career with the Canadian Women's Water Polo Team, winning various international medals. She retired from her career as a professional athlete in 2012.

2012–present 
Rosanna is a certified coach (ACC) with the International Coach Federation. She is also certified in different psychometric assessments: Myers-Briggs Type Indicator, The Birkman Method, Strong Interest Inventory and StrengthsFinder. She works with individuals and teams using a strengths-based approach to create more teamwork and engagement. Rosanna works independently and with a U.S.-based firm, Trybal Performance.

See also
 List of World Aquatics Championships medalists in water polo

External links
 

1984 births
Anglophone Quebec people
Canadian female water polo players
Living people
Loyola Marymount University alumni
People from Pointe-Claire
Water polo people from Quebec
Water polo players at the 2007 Pan American Games
Water polo players at the 2011 Pan American Games
Pan American Games medalists in water polo
Pan American Games silver medalists for Canada
Medalists at the 2011 Pan American Games